Bunda may refer to:

 Bunda District, Tanzania
 Bunda Station, a cattle station in the Northern Territory, Australia
 Robert Bunda (born 1947), American politician in the Hawaii Senate
 Bunda, nickname for Indonesian musician and entertainment personality Dorce Gamalama
 Bunda, primary component of the binary star Xi Aquarii in the constellation of Aquarius

See also
Bunde (disambiguation)